A tee is a stand used in sport to support and elevate a stationary ball prior to striking with a foot, club or bat. Tees are used extensively in golf, tee-ball, baseball, American football, and rugby.

Etymology
The word tee is derived from the Old Scots teaz, of unknown origin, possibly Scandinavian; apparently a plural form, or one incorrectly assumed to be so.

Golf tee

In golf, a tee is normally used for the first stroke of each hole. The area from which this first stroke is hit is in the rules known as the teeing ground. Normally, teeing the ball is allowed only on the first shot of a hole, called the tee shot, and is illegal for any other shot; however, local or seasonal rules may allow or require teeing for other shots as well, e.g., under "winter rules" to protect the turf when it is unusually vulnerable. Teeing gives a considerable advantage for drive shots, so it is normally done whenever allowed. However, players may elect to play their tee shots without a tee. This typically gives the shot a lower trajectory.

A standard golf tee is 2.125" (two and one eighth inches = 5.4 cm) long, but both longer and shorter tees are permitted. Ordinary tees can be made from wood or from durable plastic. There are also many biodegradable and recyclable golf tees that diminish the number of trees cut down to manufacture the tees and allow golf courses to lower costs by not having to deal with the broken wooden tees on their courses. 

According to the R&A and USGA rules of golf, for a tee to be legal, "It must not be longer than 4 inches (101.6 mm) and it must not be designed or manufactured in such a way that it could indicate the line of play or influence the movement of the ball."

History
The development of the tee was the last major change to the rules of golf. Before this, golf balls were teed up on little heaps of sand that were provided in boxes. This explains the historical name tee boxes for what is today known as teeing ground. 

The earliest golf tees rested flat on the ground and had a raised portion to prop up the ball. The first patent for this kind of tee is dated 1889, and was issued to Scotsmen William Bloxsom and Arthur Douglas. The first known tee to pierce the ground was a rubber-topped peg sold commercially as the "Perfectum." This was patented in 1892 by Percy Ellis of England. In 1899, an African-American dentist, Dr. George Franklin Grant, obtained a patent for an "improved golf tee". This tee consisted of a wood cone with a rubber sleeve to support the ball, but it is not known to have ever been marketed. 

These and other variations failed to catch on, as most golfers—whether because of tradition, habit, or concerns about the rules—continued using heaps of sand. It took a strong marketing effort by Dr. William Lowell, Sr. in the 1920s to bring manufactured tees into widespread use. Sales of his "Reddy Tee," a simple wooden peg with a flared top, took off after Lowell hired professional golfers Walter Hagen and Joe Kirkwood, Sr. to promote the product during exhibition matches. It was copied around the world, and remains the most common type of golf tee.

Tee-ball tee
Tee-ball is based on baseball, with the main difference being the use of a tee in the place of a pitcher. Much larger than a golf tee, the tee-ball tee is a durable rubber stand attached to the home plate which supports the baseball at a suitable height for the batter to hit. It is adjustable to allow for variations in batter height.

Baseball tee 

While a tee for baseball is very similar to a tee in tee-ball, the uses for the tee may differ. In baseball, a tee is used as a training device. This allows the hitter to simulate a pitch that will be thrown in many different locations. Using a tee, the hitter can set up a pitch that may be thrown inside, down the middle, and outside as well as high and low. Unlike tee-ball, where the ball is sitting on the tee, in baseball the pitch is being thrown by another player, resulting in the ball crossing the plate in several different areas. As a batter, using a tee as a training aid will help the hitter perfect his swing no matter where the pitch is thrown. A tee may also be used for batting drills. Drills are used to strengthen the players hitting motion and to get them used to hitting baseballs in different locations. 

These tees may also be used in softball as a training device.

Kicking tee

A kicking tee is a rubber or plastic platform, often with prongs and/or a brim around an inner depression.

In American football and Canadian football, a tee may be used on kickoffs to raise the ball slightly above the playing surface (up to one inch, by NFL and NCAA rules). The first use of the tee is attributed to Arda Bowser, a member of the Canton Bulldogs NFL championship team of 1922. The CFL and some high school leagues also allow the use of another sort of tee on field goal and extra point kicks, where another player (the holder) places one end of the ball on this "tee" (which is not a tee in the strictest sense of the term, but instead a rubber block; such "tees" come in 1" and 2" types) and holds the opposite end; in college and the NFL, all extra point/field goal attempts can only be made off the ground.

Tees may also be used for place kicks in rugby league football and rugby union football.

Tees are used for kick-outs in Gaelic football. In 2006, Shane Curran devised an adjustable tee on which the ball rested on brush hairs to replicate kicking from grass; the design went on to be used by most goalkeepers.

Guinness World Record 
The largest golf tee in the world was created by Jim Bolin in Casey, Illinois, USA. It measures at 9.37 m (30 ft 9 in) long with a head diameter of 1.91 m (6 ft 3 in) and a shaft width of 64 cm (2 ft 1 in).

See also
Glossary of golf

References

External links

Golf equipment
Golf terminology
American football equipment